The wandering albatross, snowy albatross, white-winged albatross or goonie (Diomedea exulans) is a large seabird from the family Diomedeidae, which has a circumpolar range in the Southern Ocean. It was the last species of albatross to be described, and was long considered the same species as the Tristan albatross and the Antipodean albatross. A few authors still consider them all subspecies of the same species. The SACC has a proposal on the table to split this species, and BirdLife International has already split it. Together with the Amsterdam albatross, it forms the wandering albatross species complex.

The wandering albatross is one of the two largest members of the genus Diomedea (the great albatrosses), being similar in size to the southern royal albatross. It is one of the largest, best known, and most studied species of bird in the world. It has the greatest known wingspan of any living bird, and is also one of the most far-ranging birds.

Taxonomy
The wandering albatross was first described as Diomedea exulans by Carl Linnaeus, in 1758, based on a specimen from the Cape of Good Hope. Diomedea refers to Diomedes whose companions turned to birds, and exulans or exsul are Latin for "exile" or "wanderer" referring to its extensive flights. The type locality has been restricted to South Georgia.

Some experts considered there to be four subspecies of D. exulans, which they elevated to species status, and use the term wandering albatross to refer to a species complex that includes the proposed species D. antipodensis, D. dabbenena, D. exulans, and D. gibsoni.

Description

On the Crozet Islands, adults averaged  in wingspan. As a result of its wingspan, it is capable of remaining in the air without flapping its wings for several hours at a time (travelling 22 m for every metre of drop). On Macquarie Island, three males averaged  and three females averaged . In the Crozet Islands, males averaged  while females averaged . However, 10 unsexed adults from the Crozets averaged . On South Georgia, 52 males were found to average  while 53 females were found to average . Immature birds have been recorded weighing as much as  during their first flights (at which time they may still have fat reserves that will be shed as they continue to fly). On South Georgia, fledglings were found to average . Albatrosses from outside the "snowy" wandering albatross group (D. exulans) are smaller but are now generally deemed to belong to different species. The plumage varies with age, with the juveniles starting chocolate brown. As they age they become whiter. The adults have white bodies with black and white wings. Males have whiter wings than females with just the tips and trailing edges of the wings black. The wandering albatross is the whitest of the wandering albatross species complex, the other species having a great deal more brown and black on the wings and body as breeding adults, very closely resembling immature wandering albatrosses. The large bill is pink, as are the feet. They also have a salt gland that is situated above the nasal passage and helps desalinate their bodies, due to the high amount of ocean water that they imbibe. They excrete a high saline solution from their nose, which is a probable cause for the pink-yellow stain seen on some animals' necks.

Distribution and habitat
The wandering albatross breeds on South Georgia Island, Crozet Islands, Kerguelen Islands, Prince Edward Islands, and Macquarie Island, is seen feeding year round off the Kaikoura Peninsula on the east coast of the South Island of New Zealand, and ranges in all the southern oceans from 28° to 60°. Wandering albatrosses spend most of their life in flight, landing only to breed and feed. Distances travelled each year are difficult to measure, but one banded bird was recorded travelling  in twelve days.

Behaviour
Wanderers have a large range of displays from screams and whistles to grunts and bill clapping. When courting they will spread their wings, wave their heads, and rap their bills together, while braying. They can live for over 50 years.

Breeding
Pairs of wandering albatrosses mate for life and breed every two years. Breeding takes place on subantarctic islands and commences in early November.

Feeding
Wandering albatrosses travel vast distances and tend to feed further out in open oceans than other albatrosses, whereas the related royal albatrosses in general tend to forage in somewhat shallower waters and closer to continental shelves. They also tend to forage in colder waters further south than other albatrosses. They feed on cephalopods, small fish, and crustaceans and on animal refuse that floats on the sea, eating to such excess at times that they are unable to fly and rest helplessly on the water. They are prone to following ships for refuse.  They can also make shallow dives.

Reproduction

The wandering albatross breeds every other year. At breeding time they occupy loose colonies on isolated island groups in the Southern Ocean. They lay this egg between 10 December and 5 January. The nests are a large bowl built of grassy vegetation and soil peat, that is 1 metre wide at the base and half a metre wide at the apex. Incubation takes about 11 weeks and both parents are involved. The 11-week incubation period is among longest of any bird. During the early stages of the chick's development, the parents take turns sitting on the nest while the other searches for food. Later, both adults search for food and visit the chick at irregular intervals. They are a monogamous species, usually for life. Adolescents return to the colony within six years; however they will not start breeding until 11 to 15 years. About 31.5% of fledglings survive.

Relationship with humans
Sailors used to capture the birds for their long wing bones, from which they made tobacco-pipe stems.  The early explorers of the great Southern Sea cheered themselves with the companionship of the albatross in their dreary solitudes; and the evil fate of him who shot with his cross-bow the "bird of good omen" is familiar to readers of Coleridge's The Rime of the Ancient Mariner. The metaphor of "an albatross around his neck" also comes from the poem and indicates an unwanted burden causing anxiety or hindrance. In the days of sail the bird often accompanied ships for days, not merely following it, but wheeling in wide circles around it without ever being observed to land on the water. It continued its flight, apparently untired, in tempestuous as well as moderate weather.

The Māori of New Zealand used albatrosses as a food source. They caught them by baiting hooks. Because the wing bones of albatross were light but very strong Māori used these to create a number of different items including koauau (flutes), needles, tattooing chisel blades, and barbs for fish hooks.

Conservation
The IUCN lists the wandering albatross as vulnerable status. Adult mortality is 5% to 7.8% per year as of 2003.

In 2007, there were an estimated 25,500 adult birds, broken down to 1,553 pairs on South Georgia Island, 1,850 pairs on Prince Edward Island, 1,600 on Marion Island, 2,000 on Crozet Islands, 1,100 on the Kerguelen Islands, and 12 on Macquarie Island for a total of 8,114 breeding pairs.
The South Georgia population is shrinking at 1.8% per year. The levels of birds at Prince Edward and the Crozet Islands seem to be stabilising although most recently there may be some shrinking of the population.

The biggest threat to their survival is longline fishing; however, pollution, mainly plastics and fishing hooks, are also taking a toll.
 
The CCAMLR has introduced measures to reduce bycatch of albatrosses around South Georgia by 99%, and other regional fishing commissions are taking similar measures to reduce fatalities. The Prince Edward Islands are a nature preserve, and the Macquarie Islands are a World Heritage site.  Finally, large parts of the Crozet Islands and the Kerguelen Islands are a nature reserve.

See also
 Sarus crane, the tallest flying bird alive today
 Bustards, which contain the heaviest living flying birds
 Pelagornis sandersi, the largest flying bird ever to live

References

Further reading
 
Lindsey, T.R. 1986. The Seabirds of Australia. Angus and Robertson, and the National Photographic Index of Australian Wildlife Sydney.
Marchant, S. and Higgins, P.J. (eds) 1993. Handbook of Australian New Zealand And Antarctic Birds Vol. 2: (Raptors To Lapwings). Oxford University Press, Melbourne.
Parmelee, D.F. 1980. Bird Island in Antarctic Waters. University of Minnesota Press, Minneapolis.

External links

Species factsheet – BirdLife International
Fact file – ARKive
Video, photos and sounds – Internet Bird Collection
Holotype photos – Collections Online, Museum of New Zealand Te Papa Tongarewa
Do albatrosses have personalities? – Video, Te Papa Channel, Museum of New Zealand Te Papa Tongarewa
Slide show – Expeditionsail

wandering albatross
wandering albatross
Birds of Patagonia
Birds of New Zealand
Birds of Southern Africa
Birds of South Australia
Birds of the Southern Ocean
Birds of islands of the Atlantic Ocean
Birds of the Indian Ocean
Fauna of the Crozet Islands
Fauna of the Prince Edward Islands
Birds of subantarctic islands
Fauna of Heard Island and McDonald Islands
wandering albatross
wandering albatross
Articles containing video clips